The year 2017 is the 20th year in the history of the M-1 Global, a mixed martial arts promotion based in Russia.

List of events

M-1 Challenge 74 - Yusupov vs. Puetz

M-1 Challenge 74 - Yusupov vs. Puetz was a mixed martial arts event held by  M-1 Global on February 18, 2017 at the Ice Palace in Saint Petersburg, Russia.

Background
This event featured two world title fight, first for the M-1 Light Heavyweight Championship Rashid Yusupov and Stephan Puetz as M-1 Challenge 74 headliner, and a Lightweight pairing between Abukar Yandiev and Alexander Butenko for the M-1 Lightweight Championship as co-headliner.

Result

M-1 Challenge 75 - Shlemenko vs. Bradley

M-1 Challenge 75 - Shlemenko vs. Bradley was a mixed martial arts event held by  M-1 Global on March 3, 2017 at the Olimpiyskiy in Moscow, Russia.

Background
This event featured a superfight between the former Bellator Middleweight Champion Alexander Shlemenko and Paul Bradley as M-1 Challenge 75 headliner, and a Welterweight pairing between Alexey Kunchenko and Maksim Grabovich for the M-1 Welterweight Championship as co-headliner.

Result

M-1 Challenge 76 - Nevzorov vs. Evloev

M-1 Challenge 76 - Nevzorov vs. Evloev was a mixed martial arts event held by  M-1 Global on April 22, 2017 at the Sports Palace "Magas" in Nazran, Russia.

Background

Result

M-1 Challenge 77 - Nemkov vs. Markes

M-1 Challenge 77 - Nemkov vs. Markes was a mixed martial arts event held by  M-1 Global on May 19, 2017 at the Sochi sport palace in Sochi, Russia.

Background

Result

M-1 Challenge 78 - Divnich vs. Ismagulov

M-1 Challenge 78 - Divnich vs. Ismagulov was a mixed martial arts event held by  M-1 Global on May 26, 2017 at the Orenburzhye Sport Arena in Orenburg, Russia.

Background

Result

M-1 Challenge 79 - Shlemenko vs. Halsey 2

M-1 Challenge 79 - Shlemenko vs. Halsey 2 was a mixed martial arts event held by  M-1 Global on June 1, 2017 at the Yubileyny Sports Palace in Saint Petersburg, Russia.

Background

Result

M-1 Challenge 80 - Kharitonov vs. Sokoudjou

M-1 Challenge 80 - Kharitonov vs. Sokoudjou was a mixed martial arts event held by  M-1 Global on June 15, 2017 at the Harbin International Convention Exhibition and Sports Center   in Harbin, China.

Background

Result

M-1 Challenge 81 - Battle in the Mountains 6

M-1 Challenge 81 - Battle in the Mountains 6 was a mixed martial arts event held by  M-1 Global on July 22, 2017 at The Mountain in Nazran, Russia.

Background

Result

M-1 Challenge 82 - Vanttinen vs. Zayats

M-1 Challenge 82 - Vanttinen vs. Zayats was a mixed martial arts event held by  M-1 Global on August 5, 2017 at The Hartwall Arena in Helsinki, Finland.

Background

Result

M-1 Challenge 83 - Ragozin vs. Halsey

M-1 Challenge 83 - Ragozin vs. Halsey will be a mixed martial arts event held by  M-1 Global on September 23, 2017 at The Basket-Hall Kazan in Kazan, Russia.

Background

Fight Card

M-1 Challenge 84 - Kunchenko vs. Romanov

M-1 Challenge 84 - Kunchenko vs. Romanov will be a mixed martial arts event held by  M-1 Global on October 27, 2017 at The Ice Palace in Saint Petersburg, Russia.

Background

Results

M-1 Challenge 85: Ismagulov vs. Matias

M-1 Challenge 85: Ismagulov vs. Matias will be a mixed martial arts event held by  M-1 Global on November 10, 2017 at The Olimpiyskiy in Moscow, Russia.

Background
Originally Damir Ismagulov was going to defend his title against the number one contender Raul Tutarauli, but unfortunately Tutarauli got injured. So Ismagulov fight was a non-title bout against Rogério Matias from Brazil.

Stephan Puetz unfortunately got injured just a few days before the event, so another fighter from Germany has taken his place, Sebastian Heil steep in on a short notice to face Giga Kukhalashvili.

Fight Card

M-1 Challenge 86 - Buchinger vs. Dalgiev

M-1 Challenge 86 - Buchinger vs. Dalgiev will be a mixed martial arts event held by  M-1 Global on November 24, 2017 at The Sports Palace "Magas" in Nazran, Russia.

Background

Fight Card

References

M-1 Global events
2017 in mixed martial arts
M-1 Global events